Sunadhar is a coastal village situated near the bank of the Devi River in the Jagatsinghpur district of Odisha, India. It is a part of the Gandakula region, which is divided into two villages, Bairakha and Sunadhar.

Geography 
The village of Sunadhar is located about 36 kilometres from the district town Jagatsinghpur on the Cuttack-Naharana road, about five kilometres from the Bay of Bengal to the east.

Sunadhar is part of the Naharana Panchayat, which falls under the Balikuda-Erasama (Odisha Vidhan Sabha constituency) of Jagatsinghpur district. According to the 2011 census, there are 139 families in the village. There are five entrances into the village. It consists of five divisions, Taalipada(ଟାଲିପଡା), Gobarddhan Pada(ଗୋବର୍ଦ୍ଧନ ପଡା), Jena Sahi (ଜେନା ସାହି), Gadipadia (ଗାଦିପଡିଆ) and  Bandha mula Swain Sahi (ବନ୍ଧମୂଳ ସ୍ଵାଇଁ ସାହି).

Tourism 
The Village is renowned for the famous historical Gandakula Yajna and Yatra at the Holy Shrine - Gadibrahma Temple every year on the auspicious day of Magha Purnima since 1949. Gandakula Jetty, Devi River Bank with mangrove forests, Marine Drive, Jham & Cashew Forest give a wonderful experience to visitors. Every year, Migratory birds, Sea turtles have shown at the bank of Devi River near Sunadhar.

Education 

A Primary School named after Sunadhar (which is permanently closed due to lack of students), an Anganwadi Center & a HSC level Coaching Center are located in this village. 

Most of villagers are literate. In 2011, literacy rate of Sunadhar was 82.42% compared to 72.87% of Odisha. In Sunadhar Male literacy stands at 87.88% while Female literacy was at 76.32%.

Economy 
There are a lot of sea creatures found in Devi River including many types of fish, crab, and prawn. It is the destination for catching salty fish, crab, prawns, and other seafood products. Through the local fisheries these products are exported to Bhubaneswar, Cuttack, Paradip and other cities. This village is rich in many types of food production like rice, cashew, mango, drumstick, and seafoods. Most of the people have business or government jobs. There are different types of self-help groups run by village women, indicating they are living at a good economic standard and are involved in community development. The government has taken great responsibilities for flood management and providing consistent water flow in the river by having a soil and stone bridge constructed.

A huge project is going on for pure water supply in village and also a project is working on development of marine-drive. This village is well connected to major cities through roads and water lines.

Culture 
Maa Kochilai and  Maa Baasulei are the traditional goddesses (Gramadevati) worshipped by the villagers of Sunadhar. Every year, during the auspicious day of Magha Purnima, Yajna & Yatra are held in Gadibrahma Temple. 

It is operated by Khandagiri Gadibrahma Puja committee. Villagers celebrate a lot of festivals that are in Odia Culture & Tradition. Some of them are Dusshera, Raja festival, Kumar Purnima, Dol Purnima, Manabasa Gurubara, Janmashtami, Ganesh Puja, Saraswati Puja, Holi, and Diwali. Among these, MKYC observes Saraswati Puja grandly. Villagers annually celebrate Independence Day, Republic Day. Since 1987, an annual state-level cricket tournament is organised during Christmas. An inter-high school level competition named "PRERANA" is arranged by MKYC every year.

References

Villages in Jagatsinghpur district